The Book of Boril or Boril Synodic is a medieval Bulgarian book from the beginning of the 13th century.
It is an important source for the history of the Bulgarian Empire.

The book was written in conjunction with the council of tsar Boril against the Bogomils in 1211. Later additions and editions were made, dated at the end of XIV c.

References

External references 
 excerpt from Boril's book
 Institute of History at the Bulgarian Academy of Sciences
 brief description and digital facsimile of the oldest copy of the Book of Boril

1211 books
Bogomilism
Medieval Bulgarian literature